Melovsky is a rural locality (a khutor) in Zakhopyorskoye Rural Settlement, Nekhayevsky District, Volgograd Oblast, Russia. The population was 8 as of 2010.

Geography 
Melovsky is located on Kalach Upland, 15 km northeast of Nekhayevskaya (the district's administrative centre) by road. Tushkanovsky is the nearest rural locality.

References 

Rural localities in Nekhayevsky District